Donald Ray Sechrest (February 16, 1933 – January 20, 2006) was an American designer of more than 90 golf courses mostly in the Midwest.

Sechrest was born in St. Joseph, Missouri, where he attended Christian Brothers High School.  He graduated in 1956 from Oklahoma State University where he played on the varsity golf team.  After graduation, he played on the PGA Tour.

His first course was Stillwater Golf and Country Club in Stillwater, Oklahoma.

Other courses included:

 Adams Pointe Golf Club - Blue Springs, Missouri
 Ames Golf & Country Club - Ames, Iowa
 Blue at Shangri-La Resort Afton, Oklahoma
 Boiling Springs Golf Course Woodward, Oklahoma
 Brownsville Golf & Recreation Center - Brownsville, Texas
 Elk City Golf & Country Club - Elk City, Oklahoma
 Fire Lake Golf Course - Shawnee, Oklahoma
 Gold at Shangri-La Resort - Afton, Oklahoma
 The Greens Country Club - Oklahoma City, Oklahoma
 Heritage Hills Golf Course - Claremore, Oklahoma
 Heritage Park Golf Course - Olathe, Kansas
 Landsmeer Golf Club - Orange City, Iowa
 Loch Lloyd Country Club - Loch Lloyd, Missouri
 Loma Linda Country Club - Joplin, Missouri
 Mozingo Lake Golf Course - Maryville, Missouri
 Pinnacle Country Club - Rogers, Arkansas
 Silo Ridge Golf & Country Club - Bolivar, Missouri
 The Golf Club at Southwind - Garden City, Kansas
 Stillwater Country Club - Stillwater, Oklahoma
 Stone Creek at Page Belcher Golf Course - Tulsa, Oklahoma
 Stroud Golf Course - Stroud, Oklahoma
 Terradyne Hotel & Country Club - Andover, Kansas
 Twin Hills Country Club - Joplin, Missouri
 Ixtapan Club de Golf in Ixtapan de la Sal, Mexico
 Windmill Course at Indian Springs Country Club Broken Arrow, OK
 Back Nine Meadowbrook Country Club Tulsa, OK
 Carthage Municipal Golf Course Carthage, MO

He was interred at Ixtapan de la Sal.

References

American male golfers
Oklahoma State Cowboys golfers
PGA Tour golfers
Golf course architects
Golfers from Missouri
Sportspeople from St. Joseph, Missouri
1933 births
2006 deaths